Carla Ferrari (born 1996) is a young French chef and TV presenter.

Biography 
Ferrari has been cooking since she was six years old. Although she was born to a family without a preference for cooking, Ferrari was a candidate in August 2008 for the Cuisine Cup, the first European competition of amateur chefs, in which candidates are evaluated by a jury of recognized chiefs, gastronomic journalists and culinary bloggers.

In February 2009, after the elimination of more than 1,500 contestants, Ferrari reached the semi-finals, the jury having selected her for the "salmon duet in small pots, cucumber velouté and small sweet pepper slippers". During the selection phase, Ferrari presented a recipe for "cooked scallops with macaroons, red pesto and risotto sauce with cracked almonds".

In 2010, with the help of 12-year-old Grégoire Souverain, Ferrari hosted Tfou de Cuisine, a TV cooking show on TF1 for juvenile audiences, and advocated against the consumption of junk food by presenting only recipes with fruits and vegetables.

References

External links
 Les vidéos TFou de Cuisine

French chefs
French television presenters
French women television presenters
Living people
1996 births